Condensin complex subunit 1 also known as chromosome-associated protein D2 (CAP-D2) or non-SMC condensin I complex subunit D2 (NCAPD2) or XCAP-D2 homolog is a protein that in humans is encoded by the NCAPD2 gene. CAP-D2 is a subunit of condensin I, a large protein complex involved in chromosome condensation.

References

Further reading

Human proteins